"Day 1" ("Dia 1") is a song recorded by American singer Leslie Grace. This is her second single from her album Leslie Grace 2013,  which was released by Top Stop Music on November 19, 2012. The music video was released early February 2013. In a studio, Leslie is singing into the camera modeling. The video ends with Leslie close up to the camera saying "You've had me from day one." It was recognized as among the most successful tropical songs by ASCAP in 2014. To version of this song. A mostly Spanish version and another version with more English in to the lyrics.

Charts

Weekly charts

Year-end charts

See also
List of number-one Billboard Tropical Songs of 2013

References 

2012 singles
2012 songs
Bachata songs
Spanish-language songs
Leslie Grace songs
Top Stop Music singles